Vrooom (stylised as VROOOM) is an EP by the band King Crimson, classified as a mini-album due to its length. It was released in 1994 as a companion to the subsequent full length album THRAK (1995). It is the first King Crimson release to feature the “double trio” of guitarists Robert Fripp and Adrian Belew, bassists Trey Gunn and Tony Levin, and drummers Bill Bruford and Pat Mastelotto.

All of the tracks on VROOOM (with the exception of "Cage" and "When I Say Stop, Continue") were re-recorded for use on the Thrak album the following year.

A series of instrumental improvisations recorded during the studio rehearsals for this album, were released five years later as The Vrooom Sessions.

Track listing
All songs written by Adrian Belew, Bill Bruford, Robert Fripp, Trey Gunn, Tony Levin and Pat Mastelotto

"VROOOM" – 7:34 (includes Coda: Marine 475, and a 0:17 unlisted 'Intro' piece on original releases)
"Sex Sleep Eat Drink Dream" – 4:42
"Cage" – 1:36
"THRAK" – 7:19
"When I Say Stop, Continue" – 5:20
"One Time" – 4:25

Personnel

King Crimson
Robert Fripp – guitar, soundscapes 
Adrian Belew – guitar, lead vocals
Tony Levin – bass guitar, Chapman Stick, backing vocals
Trey Gunn – Chapman Stick
Bill Bruford – acoustic & electric drums, percussion
Pat Mastelotto – acoustic drums, percussion

References

1994 EPs
King Crimson EPs
Albums produced by David Bottrill